Nightmare at Maple Cross is the sixth studio album by the British heavy metal band, Girlschool, released in October 13, 1986  on GWR Records. Under the direction of producer Vic Maile, this album marks the return of the band to the sound of their earlier works and to a four-piece formation. All tracks were composed by the four musicians, except for the cover of Mud's "Tiger Feet". The US version of the album included a duet with Gary Glitter covering his song, "I'm the Leader of the Gang (I Am)".

Track listing 
All tracks by Girlschool, except "Tiger Feet" by Nicky Chinn and Mike Chapman

 Track 6, in the USA, was "I'm the Leader of the Gang (I Am)", re-numbering the tracks for a total of eleven in that region.

Personnel
Band members
 Kim McAulliffe – vocals, rhythm guitar
 Cris Bonacci – lead guitar
 Gil Weston-Jones – bass
 Denise Dufort – drums

Production
Vic Maile - producer, engineer, mixing

References

External links 
 Official Girlschool discography

1986 albums
Girlschool albums
Albums produced by Vic Maile